Atlantic goldenrod is a common name for several plants and may refer to:

Solidago arguta, native to eastern North America from Maine to Texas and inland to Illinois
Solidago tarda, an uncommon plant found in the Atlantic coastal plain from New Jersey to Alabama